Levi Wilson Tavern is a historic building in Buffalo Township, Pennsylvania

It is designated as a historic residential landmark/farmstead by the Washington County History & Landmarks Foundation.

See also

 National Register of Historic Places listings in Washington County, Pennsylvania

References

External links
 [ National Register nomination form]

Houses on the National Register of Historic Places in Pennsylvania
Federal architecture in Pennsylvania
Houses completed in 1816
Houses in Washington County, Pennsylvania
Taverns in Pennsylvania
Drinking establishments on the National Register of Historic Places in Pennsylvania
Hotel buildings on the National Register of Historic Places in Pennsylvania
1816 establishments in Pennsylvania
National Register of Historic Places in Washington County, Pennsylvania